Zosteria is a genus of insects in the robber fly (Aslidae) family.

Description

Etymology

Taxonomy
Zosteria contains the following species:
 Zosteria lineata
 Zosteria novaezealandica
 Zosteria novazealandica
 Zosteria rosevillensis
 Zosteria nigrifemorata
 Zosteria ruspata
 Zosteria fulvipubescens
 Zosteria clivosa
 Zosteria calignea
 Zosteria punicea
 Zosteria alcetas
 Zosteria sydneensis
 Zosteria longiceps

References

Asilidae
Asilidae genera